Norene Lynn Gilletz (29 May 1940 – 23 February 2020) was a Canadian Jewish cookbook writer, food consultant, and food writer.

Biography
Norene Gilletz was born in Winnipeg, Manitoba to Belle and Max Rykiss. She spent her formative years in Winnipeg's North End and River Heights neighbourhoods, and attended Kelvin High School. She won a scholarship to study German at the University of Manitoba, but ultimately attended secretarial college.

Gilletz moved to Montreal in 1960, where she raised her family, later relocating to Toronto. Her writing career began in 1968 with the release of Second Helpings, Please!, edited by Gilletz and published by the Mount Sinai Chapter of B'nai Brith Women of Canada. By 2020, the cookbook was in its 17th printing and had sold over 200,000 copies.

Several years after the introduction into the North American market of the food processor by Cuisinart, Gilletz published The Pleasures of Your Processor (1980; later renamed The Food Processor Bible). Among her other cookbooks are MicroWays, MealLeaniYumm! (later titled Healthy Helpings), and Norene’s Healthy Kitchen.

Gilletz died in Montreal on 23 February 2020, at the age of 79.

Partial bibliography

References

Canadian food writers
Women cookbook writers
Jewish Canadian writers
Kosher food
1940 births
2020 deaths